Genty is a French surname. Notable people with the surname include:

 Charles Genty (1876–1956), French painter, illustrator, and caricaturist
 Jean-Claude Genty (born 1945), French racing cyclist
 Laurent Genty (born 1971), French racing cyclist
 Yann Genty (born 1981), French handball player